Spoiled Children can refer to:

 Spoiled Children (1977 film), a 1977 French film
 Spoiled Children (1980 film), a 1980 Spanish film